Elena Popa (born 1 October 1976) is a Romanian rower. She competed in the women's quadruple sculls event at the 2000 Summer Olympics.

References

External links
 

1976 births
Living people
Romanian female rowers
Olympic rowers of Romania
Rowers at the 2000 Summer Olympics
People from Bihor County